Orustdalen is a valley in Nordenskiöld Land at Spitsbergen, Svalbard. It is named after Swedish island of Orust in the province of Bohuslän. The valley has a length of about five kilometers and a width of two kilometers. It is located south of the mountains of Qvigstadfjellet, Christensenfjella and Systemafjellet.

References

Valleys of Spitsbergen